Afsar Ahmad Siddiqui (15 Marc 1935 to 12 October 2001) was a Bangladesh Nationalist Party politician and the former Member of Parliament of the now extinct Jessore-8 constituency, and also for the Jessore-5 constituency.

Birth and early life 
Afsar Ahmad Siddiqui was born in the house of late Kaiser Ahmed Siddiqui in Jessore District in 15 Marc 1935.

Career 
Siddiqui was elected to parliament from Extinct Jessore-8 as a Bangladesh Nationalist Party candidate in 1979 and Jessore-5 15 February 1996.

Death 
Afsar Ahmad Siddiqui died on 12 October 2001.

See also 
 Jatiya Sangsad
 1979 Bangladeshi general election

References

External links 
 List of 2nd Parliament Members -Jatiya Sangsad (In Bangla)
 List of 6th Parliament Members -Jatiya Sangsad (In Bangla)

1935 births
2001 deaths
People from Jessore District
University of Dhaka alumni
Bangladesh Nationalist Party politicians
2nd Jatiya Sangsad members
6th Jatiya Sangsad members